This was the first edition of the tournament.

Rubén Ramírez Hidalgo and Pere Riba won the title after defeating André Ghem and Fabrício Neis 6–7(3–7), 6–4, [10–7] in the final.

Seeds

Draw

References
 Main Draw

Curitiba Challenger - Doubles